Mümtaz Ökmen (1895 – 28 May 1961) was a Turkish former lawyer, civil servant and politician.

Biography 

After graduating from the law school of Istanbul University, he served as court clerk, assisstan judge and attorney. He also served in Ziraat Bankası (Agricultural Bank of Turkey). Beginning on 8 February 1935, he served in the Turkish parliament for four terms up to 14 May 1950 (5, 6, 7th and 8th Parliament of Turkey) as a representative of the Republican People's Party (CHP). In the 12th government of Turkey (Saydam government) he was the Minister of Commerce between 26 November 1940- 9 July 1942. In the 14th government of Turkey (2nd Saracoğlu government), he was briefly the Minister of Justice from 6 April 1946 to 7 August. In the next government (Peker government), he continued as the Minister of Justice and was appointed as the newly established vice prime minister between 19 September 1946 and 10 September 1947.

He was married and father of two. His son Lacin Okten was a prominent businessman in automobile industry.

References

1896 births
Istanbul University Faculty of Law alumni
Turkish civil servants
Republican People's Party (Turkey) politicians
Government ministers of Turkey
Ministers of Justice of Turkey
1961 deaths